The varieties (or dialects or vernacular languages) of Arabic, a Semitic language within the Afroasiatic family originating in the Arabian Peninsula, are the linguistic systems that Arabic speakers speak natively. There are considerable variations from region to region, with degrees of mutual intelligibility that are often related to geographical distance and some that are mutually unintelligible. Many aspects of the variability attested to in these modern variants can be found in the ancient Arabic dialects in the peninsula. Likewise, many of the features that characterize (or distinguish) the various modern variants can be attributed to the original settler dialects. Some organizations, such as SIL International, consider these approximately 30 different varieties to be different languages, while others, such as the Library of Congress, consider them all to be dialects of Arabic.

In terms of sociolinguistics, a major distinction exists between the formal standardized language, found mostly in writing or in prepared speech, and the widely diverging vernaculars, used for everyday speaking situations. The latter vary from country to country, from speaker to speaker (according to personal preferences, education and culture), and depending on the topic and situation.

This situation is often compared in Western literature to the Latin language, which maintained a cultured variant and several vernacular versions for centuries, until it disappeared as a spoken language, while derived Romance languages became new languages, such as Italian,  Catalan, French, Castilian, Portuguese and Romanian. The regionally prevalent variety is learned as the speaker's first language whilst the formal language is subsequently learned in school. Though Arabic speakers typically do not make this distinction, the modern iteration of the formal language itself, Modern Standard Arabic, differs from the Classical Arabic that serves as its basis. While vernacular varieties differ substantially, Fus'ha, the formal register, is standardized and universally understood by those literate in Arabic. Western scholars make a distinction between "Classical Arabic" and "Modern Standard Arabic," while speakers of Arabic generally do not consider CA and MSA to be different languages.

The largest differences between the classical/standard and the colloquial Arabic are the loss of grammatical case; a different and strict word order; the loss of the previous system of grammatical mood, along with the evolution of a new system; the loss of the inflected passive voice, except in a few relic varieties; restriction in the use of the dual number and (for most varieties) the loss of the distinctive conjugation and agreement for feminine plurals. Many Arabic dialects, Maghrebi Arabic in particular, also have significant vowel shifts and unusual consonant clusters. Unlike other dialect groups, in the Maghrebi Arabic group, first-person singular verbs begin with a n-. Further substantial differences exist between Bedouin and sedentary speech, the countryside and major cities, ethnic groups, religious groups, social classes, men and women, and the young and the old. These differences are to some degree bridgeable. Often, Arabic speakers can adjust their speech in a variety of ways according to the context and to their intentions—for example, to speak with people from different regions, to demonstrate their level of education or to draw on the authority of the spoken language.

In terms of typological classification, Arabic dialectologists distinguish between two basic norms: Bedouin and Sedentary. This is based on a set of phonological, morphological, and syntactic characteristics that distinguish between these two norms. However, it is not really possible to keep this classification, partly because the modern dialects, especially urban variants, typically amalgamate features from both norms. Geographically, modern Arabic varieties are classified into six groups: Maghrebi, Sudanese, Egyptian, Mesopotamian, Levantine and Peninsular Arabic. Speakers from distant areas, across national borders, within countries and even between cities and villages, can struggle to understand each other's dialects.

Classification

Regional varieties
The greatest variations between kinds of Arabic are those between regional language groups. Arabic dialectologists formerly distinguished between just two groups: the Mashriqi (eastern) dialects, east of Libya which includes the dialects of Arabian Peninsula, Mesopotamia, Levant, Egypt, Sudan, and the Maghrebi (western) dialects which includes the dialects of North Africa (Maghreb) west of Egypt. The mutual intelligibility is high within each of those two groups, while the intelligibility  between the two groups is asymmetric: Maghrebi speakers are more likely to understand Mashriqi than vice versa.

Arab dialectologists have now adopted a more detailed classification for modern variants of the language, which is divided into six major groups: Peninsular; Mesopotamian; Levantine; Egyptian; Sudanese; and Maghrebi.

These large regional groups do not correspond to borders of modern states. In the western parts of the Arab world, varieties are referred to as الدارجة ad-dārija, and in the eastern parts, as العامية al-ʿāmmiyya. Nearby varieties of Arabic are mostly mutually intelligible, but faraway varieties tend not to be. Varieties west of Egypt are particularly disparate, with Egyptian Arabic speakers claiming difficulty in understanding North African Arabic speakers, while North African Arabic speakers' ability to understand other Arabic speakers is mostly due to the widespread popularity of Egyptian Standard and to a lesser extent, the Levantine popular media, for example Syrian or Lebanese TV shows (this phenomenon is called asymmetric intelligibility). One factor in the differentiation of the varieties is the influence from other languages previously spoken or still presently spoken in the regions, such as Coptic, Greek and English in Egypt; French, Ottoman Turkish, Italian,  Spanish,  Berber, Punic or Phoenician in North Africa and the Levant; Himyaritic, Modern South Arabian and Old South Arabian in Yemen; and Syriac Aramaic, Akkadian, Babylonian and Sumerian in Mesopotamia (Iraq).

Maghrebi group
Western varieties are influenced by the Berber languages, Punic and by Romance languages.
 Koines
 Moroccan Arabic (الدارجة/مغربية - maḡribiyya/dārija) - (ISO 639-3: ary)
 Algerian Arabic (الدارجة/دزايري - dzayri/dārja) - (ISO 639-3: arq)
 Tunisian Arabic (الدارجة/تونسي - tūnsi/dērja) - (ISO 639-3: aeb)
 Libyan Arabic (ليبي/الدارجة - dārja/lībi) - (ISO 639-3: ayl)
 Pre-Hilalian
 Jebli Arabic
 Jijel Arabic
 Siculo-Arabic (صقلي - sīqīlli, extinct in Sicily) - (ISO 639-3: sqr)
 Maltese - (ISO 639-3: mlt)
 Bedouin
 Algerian Saharan Arabic - (ISO 639-3: aao)
 Hassaniya Arabic - (ISO 639-3: mey)
 Andalusian Arabic (أندلسي - andalūsi, extinct in Iberia, surviving among Andalusi communities in Morocco and Algeria) - (ISO 639-3: xaa)

Sudanese group
Sudanese varieties are influenced by the Nubian language.
 Sudanese Arabic (سوداني - sūdāni) - (ISO 639-3: apd)
 Juba Arabic - (ISO 639-3: pga)
 Chadian Arabic (Baggara, Shuwa Arabic) - (ISO 639-3: shu)
 Turku Arabic, pidgin

Egyptian group
Egyptian varieties are influenced by the Coptic language.
 Egyptian Arabic (مصرى - maṣri) - (ISO 639-3: arz)
 Sa'idi Arabic (صعيدى - ṣaʿīdi) - (ISO 639-3: aec)

Mesopotamian group
Mesopotamian varieties are influenced by the Mesopotamian languages (Sumerian, Akkadian, Mandaic, Eastern Aramaic), Turkish language, and Iranian languages.

 North Mesopotamian (qeltu varieties)
 North Mesopotamian Arabic or Moslawi (موصلية - mūsuliyya) - (ISO 639-3: ayp)
 Cypriot Maronite Arabic - (ISO 639-3: acy)
 Judeo-Iraqi Arabic - (ISO 639-3: yhd)
 Baghdad Jewish Arabic
 Anatolian Arabic
Baghdadi Arabic (gelet varieties) - (ISO 639-3: acm)
 South Mesopotamian 
 South Mesopotamian Arabic 
 Khuzestani Arabic

Levantine group
Levantine (ISO 639-3: apc) varieties are influenced by the Canaanite languages, Western Aramaic languages, and to a lesser extent, the Turkish language and Greek  and Persian and ancient Egyptian language:
 Palestinian Arabic (الفلسطينية)
 Jordanian Arabic (الأردنية)
 Syrian Arabic (السورية)
Damascene Arabic (الدمشقية)
 Lebanese Arabic (اللبنانية)
 Çukurova Arabic  (القيليقية)

Peninsular group
Some peninsular varieties are influenced by South Arabian Languages.
 Najdi Arabic (نجدي - najdi) - (ISO 639-3: ars)
 Gulf Arabic (خليجي - ḵalīji) - (ISO 639-3: afb)
 Bahrani Arabic (بحراني - baḥrāni) - (ISO 639-3: abv)
 Hejazi Arabic (حجازي - ḥijāzi) - (ISO 639-3: acw)
 Yemeni Arabic (يمني - yamani)
 Hadhrami Arabic (حضرمي - ḥaḍrami) - (ISO 639-3: ayh)
 Sanʽani Arabic - (ISO 639-3: ayn)
 Taʽizzi-Adeni Arabic - (ISO 639-3: acq)
 Tihamiyya Arabic
 Omani Arabic (عماني - ʿumāni) - (ISO 639-3: acx)
 Dhofari Arabic - (ISO 639-3: adf)
 Shihhi Arabic (شحّي - šiḥḥi) - (ISO 639-3: ssh)
 Bareqi Arabic
 Bedawi Arabic (البدوية- badawi/bdiwi) - (ISO 639-3: avl)

Peripheries
 Central Asian Arabic
 Tajiki Arabic - (ISO 639-3: abh)
 Uzbeki Arabic - (ISO 639-3: auz)
 Shirvani Arabic (extinct)
 Khorasani Arabic

Jewish varieties
Jewish varieties are influenced by the Hebrew and Aramaic languages. Though they have features similar to each other, they are not a homogeneous unit and still belong philologically to the same family groupings as their non-Judeo counterpart varieties. 
 Judeo-Arabic (ISO 639-3:jrb)
 Judeo-Iraqi Arabic (ISO 639-3:yhd)
 Judeo-Baghdadi Arabic
 Judeo-Moroccan Arabic (ISO 639-3:aju)
 Judeo-Tripolitanian Arabic (ISO 639-3:yud)
 Judeo-Tunisian Arabic
 Judeo-Yemeni Arabic (ISO 639-3:jye)

Creoles
 Nubi

Pidgins
 Maridi Arabic

Diglossic variety
 Modern Standard Arabic - (ISO 639-3: arb)

Language mixing and change

Arabic is characterized by a wide number of varieties; however, Arabic speakers are often able to manipulate the way they speak based on the circumstances. There can be a number of motives for changing one's speech: the formality of a situation, the need to communicate with people with different dialects, to get social approval, to differentiate oneself from the listener, when citing a written text to differentiate between personal and professional or general matters, to clarify a point, and to shift to a new topic.

An important factor in the mixing or changing of Arabic is the concept of a prestige dialect. This refers to the level of respect accorded to a language or dialect within a speech community. The formal Arabic language carries a considerable prestige in most Arabic-speaking communities, depending on the context. This is not the only source of prestige, though. Many studies have shown that for most speakers, there is a prestige variety of vernacular Arabic. In Egypt, for non-Cairenes, the prestige dialect is Cairo Arabic. For Jordanian women from Bedouin or rural background, it may be the urban dialects of the big cities, especially including the capital Amman. Moreover, in certain contexts, a dialect relatively different from formal Arabic may carry more prestige than a dialect closer to the formal language—this is the case in Bahrain, for example.

Language mixes and changes in different ways. Arabic speakers often use more than one variety of Arabic within a conversation or even a sentence. This process is referred to as code-switching. For example, a woman on a TV program could appeal to the authority of the formal language by using elements of it in her speech in order to prevent other speakers from cutting her off. Another process at work is "leveling", the "elimination of very localised dialectical features in favour of more regionally general ones." This can affect all linguistic levels—semantic, syntactic, phonological, etc. The change can be temporary, as when a group of speakers with substantially different Arabics communicate, or it can be permanent, as often happens when people from the countryside move to the city and adopt the more prestigious urban dialect, possibly over a couple of generations.

This process of accommodation sometimes appeals to the formal language, but often does not. For example, villagers in central Palestine may try to use the dialect of Jerusalem rather than their own when speaking with people with substantially different dialects, particularly since they may have a very weak grasp of the formal language. In another example, groups of educated speakers from different regions will often use dialectical forms that represent a middle ground between their dialects rather than trying to use the formal language, to make communication easier and more comprehensible. For example, to express the existential "there is" (as in, "there is a place where..."), Arabic speakers have access to many different words:
 Iraq: 
 Egypt, the Levant, and most of the Arabian peninsula  
 Tunisia: 
 Morocco and Algeria: 
 Yemen: 
 Modern Standard Arabic: 

In this case,  is most likely to be used as it is not associated with a particular region and is the closest to a dialectical middle ground for this group of speakers. Moreover, given the prevalence of movies and TV shows in Egyptian Arabic, the speakers are all likely to be familiar with it. Iraqi aku, Levantine fīh and North African kayn all evolve from Classical Arabic forms (yakūn, fīhi, kā'in respectively), but now sound very different.

Sometimes a certain dialect may be associated with backwardness and does not carry mainstream prestige—yet it will continue to be used as it carries a kind of covert prestige and serves to differentiate one group from another when necessary.

Typological differences
A basic distinction that cuts across the entire geography of the Arabic-speaking world is between sedentary and nomadic varieties (often misleadingly called Bedouin). The distinction stems from the settlement patterns in the wake of the Arab conquests. As regions were conquered, army camps were set up that eventually grew into cities, and settlement of the rural areas by nomadic Arabs gradually followed thereafter. In some areas, sedentary dialects are divided further into urban and rural variants.

The latter were mostly Arabized after the Islamic Conquests.

The other major phonetic difference is that the rural varieties preserve the Classical Arabic (CA) interdentals  ث and  ذ, and merge the CA emphatic sounds  ض and  ظ into  rather than sedentary .

The most significant differences between rural Arabic and non-rural Arabic are in syntax. The sedentary varieties in particular share a number of common innovations from CA. This has led to the suggestion, first articulated by Charles Ferguson, that a simplified koiné language developed in the army staging camps in Iraq, whence the remaining parts of the modern Arab world were conquered.

In general the rural varieties are more conservative than the sedentary varieties and the rural varieties within the Arabian peninsula are even more conservative than those elsewhere. Within the sedentary varieties, the western varieties (particularly, Moroccan Arabic) are less conservative than the eastern varieties.

A number of cities in the Arabic world speak a "Bedouin" variety, which acquires prestige in that context.

Examples of major regional differences
The following example illustrates similarities and differences between the literary, standardized varieties, and major urban dialects of Arabic. Maltese, a highly divergent Siculo-Arabic language descended from Maghrebi Arabic is also provided.

True pronunciations differ; transliterations used approach an approximate demonstration. Also, the pronunciation of Modern Standard Arabic differs significantly from region to region.

Other regional differences
"Peripheral" varieties of Arabic – that is, varieties spoken in countries where Arabic is not a dominant language and a lingua franca (e.g., Turkey, Iran, Cyprus, Chad, Nigeria and Eritrea)– are particularly divergent in some respects, especially in their vocabularies, since they are less influenced by classical Arabic. However, historically they fall within the same dialect classifications as the varieties that are spoken in countries where Arabic is the dominant language. Because most of these peripheral dialects are located in Muslim majority countries, they are now influenced by Classical Arabic and Modern Standard Arabic, the Arabic varieties of the Qur'an and their Arabic-speaking neighbours, respectively.

Probably the most divergent non-creole Arabic variety is Cypriot Maronite Arabic, a nearly extinct variety that has been heavily influenced by Greek, and written in Greek and Latin alphabets.

Maltese is descended from Siculo-Arabic. Its vocabulary has acquired a large number of loanwords from Sicilian, Italian and more recently English, and it uses only a Latin-based alphabet. It is the only Semitic language among the official languages of the European Union.

Arabic-based pidgins (which have a limited vocabulary consisting mostly of Arabic words, but lack most Arabic morphological features) are in widespread use along the southern edge of the Sahara, and have been for a long time. In the eleventh century, the medieval geographer al-Bakri records a text in an Arabic-based pidgin, probably one that was spoken in the region corresponding to modern Mauritania. In some regions, particularly around the southern Sudan, the pidgins have creolized (see the list below).

Immigrant speakers of Arabic often incorporate a significant amount of vocabulary from the host-country language in their speech, in a situation analogous to Spanglish in the United States.

Even within countries where the official language is Arabic, different varieties of Arabic are spoken. For example, within Syria, the Arabic spoken in Homs is recognized as different from the Arabic spoken in Damascus, but both are considered to be varieties of "Levantine" Arabic. And within Morocco, the Arabic of the city of Fes is considered different from the Arabic spoken elsewhere in the country.

Mutual intelligibility 
Geographically distant colloquial varieties usually differ enough to be mutually unintelligible, and some linguists consider them distinct languages. However, research by Trentman & Shiri indicates a high degree of mutual intelligibility between closely related Arabic variants for native speakers listening to words, sentences, and texts; and between more distantly related dialects in interactional situations.

Egyptian Arabic is one of the most widely understood Arabic dialects due to a thriving Egyptian television and movie industry, and Egypt's highly influential role in the region for much of the 20th century.

Formal and vernacular differences
Another way that varieties of Arabic differ is that some are formal and others are colloquial (that is, vernacular). There are two formal varieties, or اللغة الفصحى al-lugha(t) al-fuṣḥá, One of these, known in English as Modern Standard Arabic (MSA), is used in contexts such as writing, broadcasting, interviewing, and speechmaking. The other, Classical Arabic, is the language of the Qur'an. It is rarely used except in reciting the Qur'an or quoting older classical texts. (Arabic speakers typically do not make an explicit distinction between MSA and Classical Arabic.) Modern Standard Arabic was deliberately developed in the early part of the 19th century as a modernized version of Classical Arabic.

People often use a mixture of both colloquial and formal Arabic. For example, interviewers or speechmakers generally use MSA in asking prepared questions or making prepared remarks, then switch to a colloquial variety to add a spontaneous comment or respond to a question. The ratio of MSA to colloquial varieties depends on the speaker, the topic, and the situation—amongst other factors. Today even the least educated citizens are exposed to MSA through public education and exposure to mass media, and so tend to use elements of it in speaking to others. This is an example of what linguistics researchers call diglossia. See Linguistic register.

Egyptian linguist Al-Said Badawi proposed the following distinctions between the different "levels of speech" involved when speakers of Egyptian Arabic switch between vernacular and formal Arabic varieties:
 فصحى التراث fuṣḥá at-turāṯ, 'heritage classical': The Classical Arabic of Arab literary heritage and the Qur'an. This is primarily a written language, but it is heard in spoken form at the mosque or in religious programmes on television, but with a modernized pronunciation.
 فصحى العصر fuṣḥá al-ʿaṣr, 'contemporary classical' or 'modernized classical': This is what Western linguists call Modern Standard Arabic (MSA). It is a modification and simplification of Classical Arabic that was deliberately created for the modern age. Consequently, it includes many newly coined words, either adapted from Classical Arabic (much as European scholars during the Renaissance coined new English words by adapting words from Latin), or borrowed from foreign, chiefly European, languages. Although it is principally a written language, it is spoken when people read aloud from prepared texts. Highly skilled speakers can also produce it spontaneously, though this typically occurs only in the context of media broadcasts – particularly in talk and debate programs on pan-Arab television networks such as Al Jazeera and Al Arabiya – where the speakers want to be simultaneously understood by Arabic speakers in all the various countries where these networks' target audiences live. If highly skilled speakers use it spontaneously, it is spoken when Arabic speakers of different dialects communicate with each other. Commonly used as a written language, it is found in most books, newspapers, magazines, official documents, and reading primers for small children; it is also used as another version of literary form of the Qur'an and in modernized revisions of writings from Arab literary heritage.
 عامية المثقفين ʿāmmiyyat al-muṯaqqafīn, 'colloquial of the cultured' (also called Educated Spoken Arabic, Formal Spoken Arabic, or Spoken MSA by other authors): This is a vernacular dialect that has been heavily influenced by MSA, i.e. borrowed words from MSA (this is similar to the literary Romance languages, wherein scores of words were borrowed directly from Classical Latin); loanwords from MSA replace or are sometimes used alongside native words evolved from Classical Arabic in colloquial dialects. It tends to be used in serious discussions by well-educated people, but is generally not used in writing except informally. It includes a large number of foreign loanwords, chiefly relating to the technical and theoretical subjects it is used to discuss, sometimes used in non-intellectual topics. Because it can generally be understood by listeners who speak varieties of Arabic different from those of the speaker's country of origin, it is often used on television, and it is also becoming the language of instruction at universities.
 عامية المتنورين ʿāmmiyyat al-mutanawwarīn 'colloquial of the basically educated': This is the everyday language that people use in informal contexts, and that is heard on television when non-intellectual topics are being discussed. It is characterized, according to Badawi, by high levels of borrowing. Educated speakers usually code-switch between ʿāmmiyyat al-muṯaqqafīn and ʿāmmiyyat al-mutanawwarīn.
 عامية الأميين ʿāmmiyyat al-ʾummiyyīn, 'colloquial of the illiterates': This is very colloquial speech characterized by the absence of any influence from MSA and by relatively little foreign borrowing. These varieties are the almost entirely naturally evolved direct descendants of Classical Arabic.
Almost everyone in Egypt is able to use more than one of these levels of speech, and people often switch between them, sometimes within the same sentence. This is generally true in other Arabic-speaking countries as well.

The spoken dialects of Arabic have occasionally been written, usually in the Arabic alphabet. Vernacular Arabic was first recognized as a written language distinct from Classical Arabic in 17th century Ottoman Egypt, when the Cairo elite began to trend towards colloquial writing. A record of the Cairo vernacular of the time is found in the dictionary compiled by Yusuf al-Maghribi. More recently, many plays and poems, as well as a few other works exist in Lebanese Arabic and Egyptian Arabic; books of poetry, at least, exist for most varieties. In Algeria, colloquial Maghrebi Arabic was taught as a separate subject under French colonization, and some textbooks exist. Mizrahi Jews throughout the Arab world who spoke Judeo-Arabic dialects rendered newspapers, letters, accounts, stories, and translations of some parts of their liturgy in the Hebrew alphabet, adding diacritics and other conventions for letters that exist in Judeo-Arabic but not Hebrew. The Latin alphabet was advocated for Lebanese Arabic by Said Aql, whose supporters published several books in his transcription. In 1944, Abdelaziz Pasha Fahmi, a member of the Academy of the Arabic Language in Egypt proposed the replacement of the Arabic alphabet with the Latin alphabet. His proposal was discussed in two sessions in the communion but was rejected, and faced strong opposition in cultural circles. The Latin alphabet is used by Arabic speakers over the Internet or for sending messages via cellular phones when the Arabic alphabet is unavailable or difficult to use for technical reasons; this is also used in Modern Standard Arabic when Arabic speakers of different dialects communicate each other.

Linguistic distance to MSA 

Three scientific papers concluded, using various natural language processing techniques, that Levantine dialects (and especially Palestinian) were the closest colloquial varieties, in terms of lexical similarity, to Modern Standard Arabic: Harrat et al. (2015, comparing MSA to two Algerian dialects, Tunisian, Palestinian, and Syrian), El-Haj et al. (2018, comparing MSA to Egyptian, Levantine, Gulf, and North African Arabic), and Abu Kwaik et al. (2018, comparing MSA to Algerian, Tunisian, Palestinian, Syrian, Jordanian, and Egyptian).

Sociolinguistic variables
Sociolinguistics is the study of how language usage is affected by societal factors, e.g., cultural norms and contexts (see also pragmatics). The following sections examine some of the ways that modern Arab societies influence how Arabic is spoken.

Religion
The religion of Arabic speakers is sometimes involved in shaping how they speak Arabic. As is the case with other variables, religion cannot be seen in isolation. It is generally connected with the political systems in the different countries. Religion in the Arab world is not usually seen as an individual choice. Rather, it is matter of group affiliation: one is born a Muslim (and even either Sunni or Shiite among them), Christian, Druze or Jew, and this becomes a bit like one's ethnicity. Religion as a sociolinguistic variable should be understood in this context.

Bahrain provides an excellent illustration. A major distinction can be made between the Shiite Bahraini, who are the oldest population of Bahrain, and the Sunni population that began to immigrate to Bahrain in the eighteenth century. The Sunni form a minority of the population. The ruling family of Bahrain is Sunni. The colloquial language represented on TV is almost invariably that of the Sunni population. Therefore, power, prestige and financial control are associated with the Sunni Arabs. This is having a major effect on the direction of language change in Bahrain.

The case of Iraq also illustrates how there can be significant differences in how Arabic is spoken on the basis of religion. Note that the study referred to here was conducted before the Iraq War. In Baghdad, there are significant linguistic differences between Arabic Christian and Muslim inhabitants of the city. The Christians of Baghdad are a well-established community, and their dialect has evolved from the sedentary vernacular of urban medieval Iraq. The typical Muslim dialect of Baghdad is a more recent arrival in the city and comes from Bedouin speech instead. In Baghdad, as elsewhere in the Arab world, the various communities share MSA as a prestige dialect, but the Muslim colloquial dialect is associated with power and money, given that that community is the more dominant. Therefore, the Christian population of the city learns to use the Muslim dialect in more formal situations, for example, when a Christian school teacher is trying to call students in the class to order.

Variation

Writing system

Morphology and syntax
All varieties, sedentary and nomadic, differ in the following ways from Classical Arabic (CA)
 The order subject–verb–object may be more common than verb–subject–object.
 Verbal agreement between subject and object is always complete.
 In CA, there was no number agreement between subject and verb when the subject was third-person and the subject followed the verb.
 Loss of case distinctions (ʾIʿrab).
 Loss of original mood distinctions other than the indicative and imperative (i.e., subjunctive, jussive, energetic I, energetic II).
 The dialects differ in how exactly the new indicative was developed from the old forms. The sedentary dialects adopted the old subjunctive forms (feminine , masculine plural ), while many of the Bedouin dialects adopted the old indicative forms (feminine , masculine plural ).
 The sedentary dialects subsequently developed new mood distinctions; see below.
 Loss of dual marking everywhere except on nouns.
 A frozen dual persists as the regular plural marking of a small number of words that normally come in pairs (e.g., eyes, hands, parents).
 In addition, a productive dual marking on nouns exists in most dialects (Tunisian and Moroccan Arabic are exceptions). This dual marking differs syntactically from the frozen dual in that it cannot take possessive suffixes. In addition, it differs morphologically from the frozen dual in various dialects, such as Levantine Arabic.
 The productive dual differs from CA in that its use is optional, whereas the use of the CA dual was mandatory even in cases of implicitly dual reference.
 The CA dual was marked not only on nouns, but also on verbs, adjectives, pronouns and demonstratives; the dual in those varieties that have them is analyzed as plural for agreement with verbs, adjectives, pronouns, and demonstratives.
Development of an analytic genitive construction to rival the constructed genitive.
 Compare the similar development of shel in Modern Hebrew.
 The Bedouin dialects make the least use of the analytic genitive. Moroccan Arabic makes the most use of it, to the extent that the constructed genitive is no longer productive, and used only in certain relatively frozen constructions.
 The relative pronoun is no longer inflected.
 In CA, it took gender, number and case endings.
 Pronominal clitics ending in a short vowel moved the vowel before the consonant.
 Similarly, the feminine plural verbal marker  became .
 Because of the absolute prohibition in all Arabic dialects against having two vowels in hiatus, the above changes occurred only when a consonant preceded the ending. Combined with other phonetic changes, this resulted in multiple forms for each clitic (up to three), depending on the phonetic environment.
Mesopotamian dialects in southeastern Turkey are an exception for they retain the ending  for first person singular.
 In the dialect of southern Nejd (including Riyadh), the second singular masculine  has been retained, but takes the form of a long vowel rather than a short one as in CA.
 The forms given here were the original forms, and have often suffered various changes in the modern dialects.
 All of these changes were triggered by the loss of final short vowels (see below).
 Various simplifications have occurred in the range of variation in verbal paradigms.
 Third-weak verbs with radical  and radical  (traditionally transliterated y) have merged in the form I perfect tense. They had already merged in CA, except in form I.
 Doubled verbs now have the same endings as third-weak verbs.
 Some endings of third-weak verbs have been replaced by those of the strong verbs (or vice versa, in some dialects).

All dialects except some Bedouin dialects of the Arabian peninsula share the following innovations from CA
 Loss of the inflected passive (i.e., marked through internal vowel change) in finite verb forms.
 New passives have often been developed by co-opting the original reflexive formations in CA, particularly verb forms V, VI and VII (In CA these were derivational, not inflectional, as neither their existence nor exact meaning could be depended upon; however, they have often been incorporated into the inflectional system, especially in more innovative sedentary dialects).
 Hassaniya Arabic contains a newly developed inflected passive that looks somewhat like the old CA passive.
 Najdi Arabic has retained the inflected passive up to the modern era, though this feature is on its way to extinction as a result of the influence of other dialects.
 Loss of the indefinite  suffix (tanwiin) on nouns.
 In some Bedouin dialects it still marks indefiniteness on any noun, although this is optional and often used only in oral poetry.
 In other dialects it marks indefiniteness on post-modified nouns (by adjectives or relative clauses).
 All Arabic dialects preserve a form of the CA adverbial accusative  suffix, which was originally a tanwiin marker.
 Loss of verb form IV, the causative.
 Verb form II sometimes gives causatives, but is not productive.
 CA had  before form II, III and IV active, and before all passives, and  elsewhere.
 Some Bedouin dialects in the Arabian peninsula have uniform .

All sedentary dialects share the following additional innovations
 Loss of a separately distinguished feminine plural in verbs, pronouns and demonstratives. This is usually lost in adjectives as well.
 Development of a new indicative-subjunctive distinction.
 The indicative is marked by a prefix, while the subjunctive lacks this.
It is not infrequent to encounter  as an indicative prefix in some Persian Gulf states; and, in South Arabian Arabic (viz.
 Tunisian Arabic, Maltese and at least some varieties of Algerian and Libyan Arabic lack an indicative prefix. Rural dialects in Tunisia however, may use /ta/.
In Egyptian Arabic, for example, this pronoun is marked in this case only by lengthening of the final vowel and concomitant stress shift onto it, but the "h" reappears when followed by another suffix.
 ramā "he threw it"
 maramahūʃ "he didn't throw it"

The following innovations are characteristic of many or most sedentary dialects
 Agreement (verbal, adjectival) with inanimate plurals is plural, rather than feminine singular or feminine plural, as in CA.
 Development of a circumfix negative marker on the verb, involving a prefix  and a suffix .
 In combination with the fusion of the indirect object and the development of new mood markers, this results in morpheme-rich verbal complexes that can approach polysynthetic languages in their complexity.
 An example from Egyptian Arabic:
 
 [negation]-[indicative]-[2nd.person.subject]-bring-[feminine.object]-to.us-[negation]
 "You (plural) aren't bringing her (them) to us."
 (NOTE: Versteegh glosses  as continuous.)
 In Egyptian, Tunisian and Moroccan Arabic, the distinction between active and passive participles has disappeared except in form I and in some Classical borrowings.
 These dialects tend to use form V and VI active participles as the passive participles of forms II and III.

The following innovations are characteristic of Maghrebi Arabic (in North Africa, west of Egypt)
 Moroccan Arabic has greatly rearranged the system of verbal derivation, so that the traditional system of forms I through X is not applicable without some stretching.
 The triliteral type encompasses traditional form I verbs (strong:  "write"; geminate:  "smell"; hollow:  "sell",  "say",  "fear"; weak  "buy",  "crawl",  "begin"; irregular: - "eat",  "take away",  "come").
 The quadriliteral type encompasses strong [CA form II, quadriliteral form I]:  "slap",  "break",  "speak nasally"; hollow-2 [CA form III, non-CA]:  "wait",  "inflate",  "eat" (slang); hollow-3 [CA form VIII, IX]:  "choose",  "redden"; weak [CA form II weak, quadriliteral form I weak]:  "show",  "inquire"; hollow-2-weak [CA form III weak, non-CA weak]:  "end",  "roll",  "shoot"; irregular: - "send".
 There are also a certain number of quinquiliteral or longer verbs, of various sorts, e.g. weak:  "pedal",  "scheme, plan",  "dodge, fake"; remnant CA form X:  "use",  "deserve"; diminutive:  "act bourgeois",  "deal in drugs".
 Note that those types corresponding to CA forms VIII and X are rare and completely unproductive, while some of the non-CA types are productive. At one point, form IX significantly increased in productivity over CA, and there are perhaps 50–100 of these verbs currently, mostly stative but not necessarily referring to colors or bodily defects. However, this type is no longer very productive.

The following innovations are characteristic of Egyptian Arabic
 Egyptian Arabic, probably under the influence of Coptic, puts the demonstrative pronoun after the noun ( "this X" instead of CA ) and leaves interrogative pronouns in situ rather than fronting them, as in other dialects.

Phonetics

Emphasis spreading
It is associated with a concomitant decrease in the amount of pharyngealization of emphatic consonants, so that in some dialects emphasis spreading is the only way to distinguish emphatic consonants from their plain counterparts. It also pharyngealizes consonants between the source consonant and affected vowels, although the effects are much less noticeable than for vowels.
Emphasis spreading does not affect the affrication of non-emphatic  in Moroccan Arabic, with the result that these two phonemes are always distinguishable regardless of the nearby presence of other emphatic phonemes.

Consonants

  in most of the Arabian Peninsula, Northern and Eastern Yemen and parts of Oman, Southern Iraq, some parts of the Levant, Upper Egypt, Sudan, Libya, Mauritania and to lesser extent in some parts (mostly rural) of Tunisia, Algeria, and Morocco, but it is also used partially across those countries in some words.
  in most of Tunisia, Algeria and Morocco, Southern and Western Yemen and parts of Oman, Northern Iraq, parts of the Levant, especially Druze dialects. However, most other dialects of Arabic will use this pronunciation in learned words that are borrowed from Standard Arabic into the respective dialect.
  in most of the Levant and Lower Egypt, as well as some North African towns such as Tlemcen and Fez.

  in most of the Arabian peninsula, Algeria, Iraq, Upper Egypt, Sudan, parts of the Levant and Yemen.
  in most of the Levant and North Africa.
  in Lower Egypt, parts of Yemen and Oman.
 other variations include  in the Persian Gulf and southern Iraq and coastal Hadhramaut.  in some Arabian Bedouin dialects, and parts of Sudan, as the 8th-century Persian linguist Sibawayh described it.

In Morocco, Algeria and other parts of North Africa they are consistently . In Arabic-speaking towns of Eastern Turkey (Urfa, Siirt and Mardin), they respectively become .

 CA  is lost.
 When adjacent to vowels, the following simplifications take place, in order:
 V1ʔV2 → V̄ when V1 = V2
 aʔi aʔw → aj aw
 iʔV uʔV → ijV uwV
 VʔC → V̄C
 Elsewhere,  is simply lost.
 In CA and Modern Standard Arabic (MSA),  is still pronounced.
 Because this change had already happened in Meccan Arabic at the time the Qur'an was written, it is reflected in the orthography of written Arabic, where a diacritic known as hamzah is inserted either above an ʾalif, wāw or yāʾ, or "on the line" (between characters); or in certain cases, a diacritic ʾalif maddah (" ʾalif") is inserted over an ʾalif. (As a result, proper spelling of words involving  is probably one of the most difficult issues in Arabic orthography
  has reappeared medially in various words due to borrowing from CA. (In addition,  has become  in many dialects, although the two are marginally distinguishable in Egyptian Arabic, since words beginning with original  can elide this sound, whereas words beginning with original  cannot.)
 CA  often becomes  in the Persian Gulf, Iraq, some Rural Palestinian dialects and in some Bedouin dialects when adjacent to an original , particularly in the second singular feminine enclitic pronoun, where  replaces Classical  or ). Elsewhere, it remains .
 CA  is pronounced  in a few areas: Mosul, for instance, and the Jewish variety in Algiers. In all of northern Africa, a phonemic distinction has emerged between plain  and emphatic , thanks to the merging of short vowels.
 CA ) is pronounced in Iraqi Arabic and Kuwaiti Arabic with glottal closure: . In some varieties  is devoiced to  before , for some speakers of Cairene Arabic  →  (or ) "hers". The residue of this rule applies also in the Maltese language, where neither etymological  nor  are pronounced as such, but give  in this context: tagħha  "hers".
 The nature of "emphasis" differs somewhat from variety to variety. It is usually described as a concomitant pharyngealization, but in most sedentary varieties is actually velarization, or a combination of the two. (The phonetic effects of the two are only minimally different from each other.)
 CA  is also in the process of splitting into emphatic and non-emphatic varieties, with the former causing emphasis spreading, just like other emphatic consonants.
 To a large extent, Western Arabic dialects reflect this, while the situation is rather more complicated in Egyptian Arabic. (The allophonic distribution still exists to a large extent, although not in any predictable fashion; nor is one or the other variety used consistently in different words derived from the same root. Furthermore, although derivational suffixes (in particular, relational  and ) affect a preceding  in the expected fashion, inflectional suffixes do not).
 Certain other consonants, depending on the dialect, also cause pharyngealization of adjacent sounds, although the effect is typically weaker than full emphasis spreading and usually has no effect on more distant vowels.
For Moroccan Arabic, the effect is sometimes described as half as powerful as an emphatic consonant, as a vowel with uvular consonants on both sides is affected similarly to having an emphatic consonant on one side.
 The pharyngeal consonants  and  cause no emphasis spreading and may have little or no effect on adjacent vowels. In Egyptian Arabic, for example,  adjacent to either sound is a fully front .
 In some Gulf Arabic dialects,  and/or  causes backing.
 In some dialects, words such as    has backed 's and in some dialects also velarized .

Vowels
 Classical Arabic short vowels ,  and  undergo various changes.
 Original final short vowels are mostly deleted.
 Maghreb dialects merge  and  into , which is deleted when unstressed. Tunisian maintains this distinction, but deletes these vowels in non-final open syllables.
 Moroccan Arabic, under the strong influence of Berber, goes even further. This schwa then deletes everywhere except in certain words ending .
 The result is that there is no distinction between short and long vowels; borrowings from CA have "long" vowels (now pronounced half-long) uniformly substituted for original short and long vowels.
 This also results in consonant clusters of great length, which are (more or less) syllabified according to a sonority hierarchy. For some subdialects, in practice, it is very difficult to tell where, if anywhere, there are syllabic peaks in long consonant clusters in a phrase such as  "you (fem.) must write". Other dialects, in the North, make a clear distinction; they say /xəssək təktəb/ "you want to write", and not */xəssk ətkətb/.
 In Moroccan Arabic, short  and  have merged, obscuring the original distribution. In this dialect, the two varieties have completely split into separate phonemes, with one or the other used consistently across all words derived from a particular root except in a few situations.
 In Moroccan Arabic, the allophonic effect of emphatic consonants is more pronounced than elsewhere.
 On the other hand, emphasis spreading in Moroccan Arabic is less pronounced than elsewhere; usually it only spreads to the nearest full vowel on either side, although with some additional complications.
In Levantine, however, clusters of three consonants are almost never permitted. If such a cluster would occur, it is broken up through the insertion of between the second and third consonants in Egyptian Arabic, and between the first and second in Levantine Arabic.
 CA long vowels are shortened in some circumstances.
 Original final long vowels are shortened in all dialects.
 In Egyptian Arabic and Levantine Arabic, unstressed long vowels are shortened.
 Egyptian Arabic also cannot tolerate long vowels followed by two consonants, and shortens them. (Such an occurrence was rare in CA, but often occurs in modern dialects as a result of elision of a short vowel.)
 In most dialects, particularly sedentary ones, CA  and  have two strongly divergent allophones, depending on the phonetic context.
 The two allophones are in the process of splitting phonemically in some dialects, as  occurs in some words (particularly foreign borrowings) even in the absence of any emphatic consonants anywhere in the word. (Some linguists have postulated additional emphatic phonemes in an attempt to handle these circumstances; in the extreme case, this requires assuming that every phoneme occurs doubled, in emphatic and non-emphatic varieties. Some have attempted to make the vowel allophones autonomous and eliminate the emphatic consonants as phonemes. Others have asserted that emphasis is actually a property of syllables or whole words rather than of individual vowels or consonants. None of these proposals seems particularly tenable, however, given the variable and unpredictable nature of emphasis spreading.)
The diphthongs are maintained in the Maltese language and some urban Tunisian dialects, particularly that of Sfax, while  and  also occur in some other Tunisian dialects, such as Monastir.
 The placement of the stress accent is extremely variable between varieties; nowhere is it phonemic.
 Most commonly, it falls on the last syllable containing a long vowel, or a short vowel followed by two consonants; but never farther from the end than the third-to-last syllable. This maintains the presumed stress pattern in CA (although there is some disagreement over whether stress could move farther back than the third-to-last syllable), and is also used in Modern Standard Arabic (MSA).
 In CA and MSA, stress cannot occur on a final long vowel; however, this does not result in different stress patterns on any words, because CA final long vowels are shortened in all modern dialects, and any current final long vowels are secondary developments from words containing a long vowel followed by a consonant.
 In Maghrebi Arabic, stress is final in words of the (original) form CaCaC, after which the first  is elided. Hence   "mountain" becomes .
 In Moroccan Arabic, phonetic stress is often not recognizable.

See also
 Arabic diglossia
 Arabic (disambiguation)
 International Association of Arabic Dialectology (AIDA)

References

Citations

Sources 

 Abdel-Jawad, H. (1986). 'The emergence of a dialect in Jordanian urban centres.' International Journal of the Sociology of Language 61.
 Abu-Haidar, F. (1991). Christian Arabic of Baghdad, Weisbaden: Otto Harasowitz.
 Abu-Melhim, A. R. (1991). 'Code-switching and accommodation in Arabic.' Perspectives on Arabic Linguistics.
 Al-Sawi, M. (5..4). 'Writing Arabic with Roman letters.' https://www.academia.edu/843265/writing_Arabic_in_the_Latin_letters._
 Badawi, S.A. (1973). Mustawayāt al-'Arabīyah al-mu'āṣirah fī Miṣr: Baḥth fī 'alāqat al-lughah bi-al-ḥaḍārah, Cairo: Dār al-Ma'ārif.
 Bassiouney, Reem (2006). Functions of code-switching in Egypt: Evidence from monologues, Leiden: Brill.
 Bassiouney, Reem (2009). Arabic Sociolinguistics, Washington, D.C.: Georgetown University Press.
 Blanc, D. (1960) 'Style variations in Arabic: A sample of interdialectical conversation.' in C.A. Ferguson (ed.) Contributions to Arabic linguistics, Cambridge, M.A.: Harvard University Press.
 Dendane, Z. (1994). 'Sociolinguistic variation in an Arabic speech community: Tlemcen.' Cahiers de Dialectologie et de Linguistique Contrastive 4.
 El-Hassan, S. (1997). 'Educated Spoken Arabic in Egypt and the Levant: A critical review of diglossia and related concepts.' Archivum Linguisticum 8(2).
 Ferguson, C.A. (1972). 'Diglossia.' Word 15.
 Holes, C. (1983). 'Bahrain dialects: Sectarian differences exemplified through texts.' Zeitschrift fur arabische Linguistik10.
 Holes, C. (1995). 'Community, dialect and urbanization in the Arabic-speaking Middle-East.' Bulletin of the School of Oriental and African Studies 58(2).
 Mitchell, T.F. (1986). 'What is educated spoken Arabic?' International Journal of the Sociology of Language 61.
 Pereira, C. (2007). 'Urbanization and dialect change: The dialect of Tripoli, Libya.' in C. Miller, E. Al-Wer, D. Caubet and J.C.E. Watson (eds), Arabic in the city: Issues in dialect contact and language variation, London and New York: Routledge.
 Suleiman, Y. (1994). Arabic sociolinguistics: Issues and perspectives, Richmond: Curzon.
 Versteegh, K. (2001). The Arabic language, Edinburgh: Edinburgh University Press.

Further reading
Arabic Varieties: Far and Wide. Proceedings of the 11th International Conference of AIDA Bucharest 2015
 A Bibliography of Association Internationale de Dialectologie Arabe
 AIDA – Association Internationale de Dialectologie Arabe
 George Grigore L'arabe parlé à Mardin. Monographie d'un parler arabe périphérique.
 Durand, O., (1995), Introduzione ai dialetti arabi, Centro Studi Camito-Semitici, Milan.
 Durand, O., (2009), Dialettologia araba, Carocci Editore, Rome.
 Fischer W. & Jastrow O., (1980) Handbuch der Arabischen Dialekte, Harrassowitz, Wiesbaden.
 Heath, Jeffrey "Ablaut and Ambiguity: Phonology of a Moroccan Arabic Dialect" (Albany: State University of New York Press, 1987)
 Holes, Clive (2004) Modern Arabic: Structures, Functions, and Varieties Georgetown University Press. 
 Versteegh, Dialects of Arabic
 Kees Versteegh, The Arabic Language (New York: Columbia University Press, 1997)
 Columbia Arabic Dialect Modeling (CADIM) Group
 Israeli Hebrew and Modern Arabic – a Few Differences and Many Parallels
 Peripheral Arabic Dialects
Varieties of Arabic Swadesh lists (from Wiktionary's Swadesh-list appendix)

External links 
 Swadesh lists: Varieties of Arabic

 
Arabic language
Arabic